Poland participated in the Eurovision Song Contest 2014 with the song "My Słowianie – We Are Slavic" written and performed by Donatan and Cleo. In December 2013, the Polish broadcaster Telewizja Polska (TVP) announced that it would be returning the Eurovision Song Contest after a two-year absence, and that the Polish entry for the 2014 contest in Copenhagen, Denmark would be selected through an internal selection. "My Słowianie – We Are Slavic" performed by Donatan and Cleo was announced as the Polish entry on 25 February 2014 during the TVP1 programme Świat się kręci, while the song was presented to the public on 18 March 2014.

Poland was drawn to compete in the second semi-final of the Eurovision Song Contest which took place on 8 May 2014. Performing during the show in position 5, "My Słowianie – We Are Slavic" was announced among the top 10 entries of the second semi-final and therefore qualified to compete in the final on 10 May. It was later revealed that Poland placed eighth out of the 15 participating countries in the semi-final with 70 points. In the final, Poland performed in position 9 and placed fourteenth out of the 26 participating countries, scoring 62 points.

Background 

Poland's highest placement in the contest, to this point, has been second place, which the nation achieved with its debut entry in 1994 with the song "To nie ja!" performed by Edyta Górniak. Poland has only, thus far, reached the top ten on one other occasion, when Ich Troje performing the song "Keine Grenzen – Żadnych granic" finished seventh in 2003. Between 2005 and 2011, Poland failed to qualify from the semi-final round six out of seven years with only their 2008 entry, "For Life" performed by Isis Gee, managing to take the nation to the final during that period. After once again failing to qualify to the final in 2011 with their entry "Jestem" performed by Magdalena Tul, the country withdrew from the contest during 2012 and 2013 citing reasons such as to focus on the 2012 UEFA European Football Championship (which Poland co-hosted with Ukraine) and the 2012 Summer Olympics, as well as the contest lacking focus on music and the presence of voting among neighbouring countries behind the decision.

The Polish national broadcaster, Telewizja Polska (TVP), broadcasts the event within Poland and organises the selection process for the nation's entry. Following a two-year absence, TVP confirmed Poland's participation in the 2014 Eurovision Song Contest on 5 December 2013 after being motivated by a reduction in participation fees by the European Broadcasting Union. Between 2006 and 2011, TVP organised televised national finals that featured a competition among several artists and songs in order to select the Polish entry for the Eurovision Song Contest. For the 2014 Eurovision Song Contest, TVP opted to internally select the Polish entry.

Before Eurovision

Internal selection
TVP announced in January 2014 that the Polish entry for the 2014 Eurovision Song Contest would be selected via an internal selection and would be presented in February 2014. The six-member selection committee that selected the Polish entry consisted of Mikołaj Dobrowolski (Head of Delegation for Poland at the Eurovision Song Contest), Maria Szabłowska (music journalist at TVP and Polish Radio), Artur Orzech (Eurovision commentator, radio and television journalist and presenter), Krzysztof Szewczyk (journalist), Marek Sierocki (music journalist and artistic directors of the Opole Festival and Sopot Festival) and Paweł Sztompkę (journalist, music critic and editorial director of music at Polish Radio).

On 20 February 2014 during the TVP1 programme Świat się kręci, hosted by Agata Młynarska, it was announced that Donatan and Cleo would represent Poland in the Eurovision Song Contest 2014 with the song "My Słowianie", written by Donatan and Cleo themselves. In the months prior to the selection announcement, the duo were heavily rumoured on social media to represent Poland after they attended a meeting with TVP regarding the 2014 contest. The Polish language version of the song, titled "My Słowianie" and released in November 2013, previously received media exposure for its music video which mocks Polish stereotypes. "My Słowianie" was edited for the Eurovision Song Contest since the song exceeded three minutes, and featured additional lyrics in English. The bilingual version, titled "My Słowianie – We Are Slavic", was released on 18 March 2014 via the official Eurovision Song Contest's YouTube channel.

Promotion 
Donatan and Cleo made several appearances across Europe to specifically promote "My Słowianie – We Are Slavic" as the Polish Eurovision entry. On 29 March, Donatan and Cleo performed during the Eurovision PreParty Riga, which was organised by OGAE Latvia and held at the Andalūzijas Suns in Riga. On 13 April, Donatan and Cleo performed during the London Eurovision Party, which was held at the Café de Paris venue in London, United Kingdom and hosted by Nicki French and Paddy O'Connell.

At Eurovision

According to Eurovision rules, all nations with the exceptions of the host country and the "Big Five" (France, Germany, Italy, Spain and the United Kingdom) are required to qualify from one of two semi-finals in order to compete for the final; the top ten countries from each semi-final progress to the final. The European Broadcasting Union (EBU) split up the competing countries into six different pots based on voting patterns from previous contests, with countries with favourable voting histories put into the same pot. On 20 January 2014, a special allocation draw was held which placed each country into one of the two semi-finals, as well as which half of the show they would perform in. Poland was placed into the second semi-final, to be held on 8 May 2014, and was scheduled to perform in the first half of the show.

Once all the competing songs for the 2014 contest had been released, the running order for the semi-finals was decided by the shows' producers rather than through another draw, so that similar songs were not placed next to each other. Poland was set to perform in position 5, following the entry from Georgia and before the entry from Austria.

The two semi-finals and the final were broadcast in Poland on TVP1, TVP1 HD and TVP Polonia with commentary by Artur Orzech. The three shows also aired on a one-day delay on TVP Rozrywka. The Polish spokesperson, who announced the Polish votes during the final, was Paulina Chylewska.

Semi-final 

Cleo, appearing without Donatan on stage, took part in technical rehearsals on 29 April and 3 May, followed by dress rehearsals on 7 and 8 May. This included the jury show on 7 May where the professional juries of each country watched and voted on the competing entries.

The Polish performance featured Cleo performing with three female backing vocalists/dancers and two female models, all in traditional Polish outfits. During the performance, the models suggestively churned butter and washed laundry on stage. The stage LED screens displayed white and red Polish ornaments. The backing performers that joined Cleo on stage were members of the Mazowsze folk group, Alesia Turonak, Sylwia Klan and Anna Łapińska, while the models were members of the Śląsk folk ensemble, Ola Ciupa and Paula Tumala.

At the end of the show, Poland was announced as having finished in the top 10 and subsequently qualifying for the grand final. It was later revealed that Poland placed eighth in the semi-final, receiving a total of 70 points.

Final 
Shortly after the second semi-final, a winners' press conference was held for the ten qualifying countries. As part of this press conference, the qualifying artists took part in a draw to determine which half of the grand final they would subsequently participate in. This draw was done in the order the countries were announced during the semi-final. Poland was drawn to compete in the first half. Following this draw, the shows' producers decided upon the running order of the final, as they had done for the semi-finals. Poland was subsequently placed to perform in position 9, following the entry from Montenegro and before the entry from Greece.

Cleo once again took part in dress rehearsals on 9 and 10 May before the final, including the jury final where the professional juries cast their final votes before the live show. Cleo performed a repeat of her semi-final performance during the final on 10 May. Poland placed fourteenth in the final, scoring 62 points.

Voting 
Voting during the three shows consisted of 50 percent public televoting and 50 percent from a jury deliberation. The jury consisted of five music industry professionals who were citizens of the country they represent. This jury was asked to judge each contestant based on: vocal capacity; the stage performance; the song's composition and originality; and the overall impression by the act. In addition, no member of a national jury could be related in any way to any of the competing acts in such a way that they cannot vote impartially and independently.

Below is a breakdown of points awarded to Poland and awarded by Poland in the second semi-final and grand final of the contest, and the breakdown of the jury voting and televoting conducted during the two shows:

Points awarded to Poland

Points awarded by Poland

Detailed voting results
The following members comprised the Polish jury:
  (jury chairperson)radio journalist
 Dorota Szpetkowskajournalist
 singer
 Magdalena Tulsinger, represented Poland in the 2011 contest
 singer, represented Poland in the 1999 contest

References

2014
Countries in the Eurovision Song Contest 2014
Eurovision
Eurovision